John Bound is an American labor economist who serves as George E. Johnson Collegiate Professor of Economics and Director of Doctoral Admissions in the College of Literature, Science, and the Arts at the University of Michigan. He is an elected fellow of the Econometric Society and the Society of Labor Economists.

References

External links
Faculty page

Living people
University of Michigan faculty
21st-century American economists
20th-century American economists
Harvard University alumni
Labor economists
Fellows of the Econometric Society
Year of birth missing (living people)